Elisa Rosales Ochoa (December 3, 1897 – September 20, 1978) was the first woman elected to the Philippine Congress in 1941.

Background
Ochoa was born in Butuan, in what was then the province of Agusan. Her parents were Canuto Rosales and Ramona Villanueva, In 1915, she became a licensed nurse after completing her studies at the Philippine General Hospital. She married Enrique Ochoa, a physician and spent the next several years working at different hospitals as a nurse.

In 1934, Ochoa returned to schooling, finally obtaining a high school diploma. By 1936, she had obtained an associate of arts degree from the National University. After passing a civil service examination for nursing superintendents in law school.

First woman member of Congress
In 1937, the right of suffrage was extended to Filipino women after a law allowing the same was approved via plebiscite. Elections for the House of Representatives were scheduled for 1941. Ochoa interrupted her law school studies to return home and run for the National Assembly of the Japanese-sponsored Second Philippine Republic representing the province of Agusan. Ochoa handily won the election on November 11, 1941.

Ochoa would not have the opportunity to fully serve out her term. Less than a month after her election, the Japanese invasion of the Philippines commenced, and the National Assembly was unable to convene until it was reorganized under the control of the Japanese in 1943. Ochoa nonetheless tried to perform her official duties as a member of Congress. She was active in humanitarian efforts during the Second World War. After the restoration of the Commonwealth government under President Sergio Osmeña, Ochoa resumed her duties as the duly elected Congresswoman of Agusan.

Later life
Ochoa's term expired in 1946, and she was not a member of the 1st Congress that was elected in that year. Still, Ochoa remained in public service, acting as a presidential technical assistant on health to Presidents Ramon Magsaysay and Carlos P. Garcia. She would also help establish a school for midwifery in her hometown, Butuan.

Ochoa died on September 20, 1978, at the age of 80. She is buried in Butuan. She left behind a daughter, Aida Veloso, and 2 grandchildren.

References

 

Filipino nurses
Filipino suffragists
People from Agusan del Norte
1897 births
1978 deaths
Women members of the House of Representatives of the Philippines
Members of the House of Representatives of the Philippines from Agusan del Norte
Members of the House of Representatives of the Philippines from Agusan del Sur
Filipino collaborators with Imperial Japan
People from Butuan
KALIBAPI politicians
Nacionalista Party politicians
National University (Philippines) alumni
Members of the National Assembly (Second Philippine Republic)
Members of the National Assembly of the Philippines